Duva is an American surname of Italian origin. Notable people with the surname include:

 Dan Duva (1951–1996), American boxing promoter
 Dino Duva (born 1958), American boxing promoter
 Kathy Duva, American boxing promoter
 Lou Duva (born 1922), American businessperson

Surnames of Italian origin